Ganjeh is a village in Alishervan Rural District, in the Sivan District of Ilam County, Ilam Province, Iran. At the 2006 census, its population was 169, in 35 families. The village is populated by Kurds.

References 

Populated places in Ilam County
Kurdish settlements in Ilam Province